The Battle of the River Bug, sometimes known as the Battle of Volhynia, was a battle that took place on 22–23 July 1018, in Red Ruthenia, near the Bug River and near Volhynia (Wołyń), between the forces of Bolesław I the Brave of Poland and Yaroslav the Wise of Kievan Rus, during the Bolesław's Kiev Expedition. Yaroslav was defeated by the Polish duke.  It was part of the war of succession following the death of Vladimir the Great in 1015.  Boleslaw supported his son-in-law, Sviatopolk (known as Sviatopolk the Damned for his murder of his half-brothers Boris and Gleb), who was eventually defeated by Yaroslav.

Both armies met on opposite banks of the river Bug. Yaroslav's forces took up positions with archers covering the crossing points; Bolesław took his time, allowing his army to rest, and started work on several makeshift bridges. The main battle occurred on 23 July. According to Polish chronicler Gall Anonim, the battle occurred by accident: Bolesław decided to throw a feast to boost morale of his army; Yaroslav's archers and scouts decided to stir up trouble for the Polish servants who were gutting the animals and preparing them near the river - but they only succeeded in annoying them so much that the servants themselves crossed the relatively shallow river and chased Yaroslav's much-surprised advance troops away. Bolesław learned about this quicker than Yaroslav, and managed to move most of his army across the river and attack the surprised Kievan prince, who didn't manage to muster his army in time; the Kievan army quickly broke rank and fled. However a Russian chronicle, Tale of Bygone Years gives a slightly different version of these events, one version which both armies were combat-ready and facing each other across the river, and Bolesław, enraged by insults hurled by the Rus' army, charged across the army with at the head of his army, surprising Yaroslav and shattering the Kievan army. Most modern historians support Gall Anonim's version, and all agree that after a short battle the Polish Duke was victorious, scoring a major victory. Yaroslav retreated to Novogrod, not Kiev - likely suspecting that he has not enough strength left to defend Kiev, besieged by the Pechengs, and with a significant pro-Sviatopolk (Boleslaw's son-in-law) faction inside the city.

While Yaroslav lost the battle, he was able to raise troops among the Novgorodians and eventually defeat his half-brother Sviatopolk and consolidate his position in Kiev, where he ruled over the golden age of Kievan Rus' until his death in 1054.  Thus, in spite of this defeat at the hands of the Polish duke, Yaroslav became the greatest of the Kievan rulers.

References

River Bug
River Bug
1018 in Europe
River Bug
11th century in Poland
11th century in Kievan Rus'
History of Lublin Voivodeship